Frenchy Brown was an American Negro league first baseman in the 1900s.

Brown played for the Buxton Wonders in 1909. In four recorded games, he posted three hits in 17 plate appearances.

References

External links
Baseball statistics and player information from Baseball-Reference Black Baseball Stats and Seamheads

Year of birth missing
Year of death missing
Place of birth missing
Place of death missing
Buxton Wonders players